Benjamin Aaron Shapiro (born January 15, 1984) is an American conservative political commentator and media personality. At age 17, he became the youngest nationally syndicated columnist in the United States. Shapiro writes columns for Creators Syndicate, Newsweek, and Ami Magazine, and serves as editor emeritus for The Daily Wire, which he founded. Shapiro is the host of The Ben Shapiro Show, a daily political podcast and live radio show. He was editor-at-large of Breitbart News between 2012 and 2016. Shapiro has written eleven books.

Early life and education 
Shapiro was born in Los Angeles, California, to a Conservative Jewish family of Russian-Jewish and Lithuanian-Jewish ancestry. When he was 9 years old, his family transitioned to Orthodox Judaism. He started playing violin at a young age and performed at the Israel Bonds Banquet in 1996 at twelve years of age. His parents both worked in Hollywood. His mother was an executive of a TV company, and his father David Shapiro worked as a composer.

Skipping two grades (third and ninth), Shapiro went from Walter Reed Middle School in The Valley to Yeshiva University High School of Los Angeles in Westside, Los Angeles, where he graduated in 2000 at age 16. He graduated from the University of California, Los Angeles in 2004 summa cum laude and Phi Beta Kappa, at age 20, with a Bachelor of Arts degree in political science, and then from Harvard Law School in 2007 cum laude.

Career 
After graduating law school, he then worked at the law offices of Goodwin Procter. , he ran an independent legal consultancy firm, Benjamin Shapiro Legal Consulting, in Los Angeles.

Author 
Shapiro became interested in politics at a young age. He started a nationally syndicated column when he was 17 and had written two books by age 21.

In his first book Brainwashed: How Universities Indoctrinate America's Youth (2004), Shapiro argues that the American Left has ideological dominance over universities and that professors do not tolerate non-left opinions.

In 2011, HarperCollins published Shapiro's fourth book, Primetime Propaganda: The True Hollywood Story of How the Left Took Over Your TV, in which Shapiro argues that Hollywood has a left-wing agenda that it actively promotes through prime-time entertainment programming. In the book, the producers of Happy Days and M*A*S*H say they pursued a pro-pacifist, anti-Vietnam-War agenda in those series. Shapiro also became a fellow at the David Horowitz Freedom Center.

In 2013, Threshold Editions published Shapiro's fifth book, Bullies: How the Left's Culture of Fear and Intimidation Silences Americans.

In 2017, he released his first and to date only fiction novel, True Allegiance.

In 2019, Shapiro published the book The Right Side of History: How Reason and Moral Purpose Made the West Great, which focuses on the importance of Judaeo-Christian values and laments the decline of those values in modern America.

In 2021, Shapiro published the book The Authoritarian Moment, which argues that there is not a pressing authoritarian threat in U.S. politics from the right-wing. Rather, he argues that the authoritarian threat comes from the left's control of academia, Hollywood, journalism, and corporate America.

Breitbart News 
In 2012, Shapiro became editor-at-large of Breitbart News, a website founded by Andrew Breitbart. After Brietbart fell under the leadership of Steve Bannon, Shapiro attempted to distance himself from Bannon due to fear of ending up on his bad side.

On February 7, 2013, Shapiro published an article citing unspecified Senate sources who said that a group named "Friends of Hamas" was among foreign contributors to the political campaign of Chuck Hagel, a former U.S. Senator awaiting confirmation as Secretary of Defense as a nominee of President Barack Obama, but weeks later Slate reporter David Weigel reported there was no evidence such a group existed. Shapiro told Weigel that the story he published was "the entirety of the information [he] had." Shapiro later expressed regret over publishing the story..

In March 2016, Shapiro resigned from his position as editor-at-large of Breitbart News following what he characterized as the website's lack of support for reporter Michelle Fields in response to her alleged assault by Corey Lewandowski, Donald Trump's former campaign manager, in spite of video and eyewitness evidence of the assault. In his resignation statement, Shapiro stated that "Steve Bannon is a bully," Donald Trump is a bully, and that Bannon had "shaped the company into Trump's personal Pravda." After Shapiro's departure, Breitbart published a piece, falsely attributed to Shapiro's father's pseudonym, saying "Ben Shapiro betrays loyal Breitbart readers in pursuit of Fox News contributorship," which Breitbart later deleted. Despite being critical of Bannon, Shapiro defended Bannon when he was accused of antisemitism.

Other media activities 
On October 7, 2013, Shapiro and business partner Jeremy Boreing co-founded TruthRevolt, a U.S. media watchdog and activism website, in association with the David Horowitz Freedom Center. TruthRevolt ceased operations in March 2018.

On January 14, 2021, Shapiro was featured as a guest writer for Politico Playbook newsletter, where he defended House Republicans who opposed the second impeachment of Donald Trump. The newsletter drew immense backlash from many Politico staffers, some of whom argued that Shapiro should not have been allowed to write the article. Matthew Kaminski, editor in chief of Politico, refused to apologize and defended the decision to allow Shapiro to write the article, stating that, "We're not going to back away from having published something because some people think it was a mistake to do so." According to the Daily Beast, more than 100 Politico staffers signed on to a letter to publisher Robert Allbritton criticizing both Politico's decision to feature Shapiro's article and the response from Kaminski.

Host 

In 2012, Shapiro joined KRLA-AM 870 as a host on their morning radio program alongside Heidi Harris and Brian Whitman. By 2016, he was one of the hosts for KRLA's The Morning Answer, a conservative radio show. Internal emails showed that Shapiro faced pressure from Salem Media executives, the syndicate that owned the show, to be more supportive of Donald Trump during the 2016 presidential election. Shapiro however remained highly critical of Trump throughout the election.

Shapiro and Boreing founded The Daily Wire on September 21, 2015. He serves as editor emeritus as well as the host of his online political podcast The Ben Shapiro Show, broadcast every weekday. , the podcast was ranked by Podtrac as the second most popular podcast in the U.S. Westwood One began syndicating The Ben Shapiro Show podcast to radio in April 2018. In 2018, Politico described the podcast as "massively popular". In January 2019, Westwood One expanded Shapiro's one-hour podcast-to-radio program, adding a nationally syndicated two-hour live radio show, for three hours of Ben Shapiro programming daily. As of March 2019, according to Westwood One, The Ben Shapiro Show is being carried by more than 200 stations, including in nine of the top ten markets. In June 2020, Shapiro stepped down from his role as editor-in-chief, which he had held since the site's founding, and took on the role of editor emeritus.

In September 2018, Shapiro started hosting The Ben Shapiro Election Special on Fox News. The limited-run series covered news and issues relating to the 2018 midterm elections.

Shapiro has made frequent appearances on PragerU with talks on intersectionality and Hollywood with 4,900,000 to 8,400,000 views .

In 2021, Ben Shapiro's podcast was ranked as the 9th most listened on Apple podcasts.

Speaker 

Shapiro speaks at college campuses across the United States. In his speeches, he often presents a conservative viewpoint on controversial subjects. He spoke at 37 campuses between early 2016 and late 2017.

Some students and faculty members at California State University, Los Angeles objected to a speech that Shapiro, who was then an editor at Breitbart News, was scheduled to hold at the university on February 25, 2016, titled "When Diversity Becomes a Problem". University president William Covino canceled the speech three days before it was to take place, with the intention of rescheduling it so that the event could feature various viewpoints on the subject of campus diversity. Covino ultimately reversed his decision, allowing the speech to go on as planned. The day of the speech, student protesters formed human chains, blocking the doors to the event and staging sit-in protests. When Shapiro began his speech, a protester pulled the fire alarm. After the speech ended, Shapiro was escorted out by campus police. Young America's Foundation announced it was filing a lawsuit against the university (with Shapiro as one of the plaintiffs), claiming that the First and Fourteenth Amendment rights of the students were violated by Covino's attempted cancellation of the event as well as by the physical barricading of students from entering or leaving the event.

In August 2016, DePaul University revoked an invitation for Shapiro to address students at the school and barred him from entering the campus owing to "security concerns."

On September 14, 2017, Shapiro gave a speech at the invitation of the University of California, Berkeley student organization Berkeley College Republicans in which he criticized identity politics. The event involved a large police presence, which had been promised by Berkeley Chancellor Carol T. Christ in her August letter that supported free speech. Together, the university and the city of Berkeley spent $600,000 on police and security for the event, which transpired with nine arrests but no major incidents.

Views 

In 2016, Shapiro described himself as "basically a libertarian". In 2021, he described himself as "generally libertarian" in regards to the role of the government and as a conservative in regards to the role of social structures. The New Yorker, Haaretz and Vox have described Shapiro as "right-wing". Shapiro's views have been described by The New York Times as "extremely conservative" and was described by The Economist as a "radical conservative" and as a "classically religious-conservative". A 2020 study News, Nationalism, and Hegemony: The Formation of Consistent Issue Framing Throughout the U.S. Political Right examining issue framing by right-wing podcasts used The Ben Shapiro Show as an example which "offered a mainstream conservative perspective that favors President Donald Trump and his framing on issues like "nationalism"" in a two-by-two matrix that also examined a Stormfront podcast, an alt-right podcast, and the Daily Standard podcast; the study showed that Shapiro's rhetoric was similar to that used in the Stormfront podcast, though with a different tone.

Shapiro accuses the political left of believing in an imaginary "hierarchy of victimhood" in which the opinions of members of persecuted groups like the LGBT community are afforded more credence. He has argued that the left has dominated American culture through popular entertainment, media, and academia in a way that has made conservatives feel disenfranchised, and helped lead to the election of Donald Trump in the 2016 presidential election. He has stated that "political correctness breeds insanity". Shapiro is an outspoken opponent of safe spaces, especially those on college campuses, arguing that they go against free speech. Shapiro frequently praises "Western culture" and "Western civilization". In 2019, he said "I believe Western civilization is superior to other civilizations."

Abortion 

Shapiro supports a ban on abortion, including in cases of rape and incest, with one exception: when competent medical authority determines that the life of the mother is in jeopardy as a result of the pregnancy. He has further clarified that this includes extreme cases of mental illness where the life of the mother is at risk due to suicide. He also believes that doctors who perform abortions should be prosecuted. He has referred to women who have abortions as "baby killers." In 2019, Shapiro asserted that "the Supreme Court overturning Roe v. Wade" was "not going to happen", and added that he had "serious doubts" about "whether the Supreme Court, as currently constituted, would vote to overturn Roe v. Wade".

In 2019, Shapiro spoke at the annual March for Life in Washington, D.C., where he said abortion is a "violent act".

Alt-right 
Shapiro is a critic of the alt-right movement, stating in 2017, "It is a garbage movement composed of garbage ideas. It has nothing to do with constitutional conservatism." In 2019, Shapiro criticized weekly newspaper The Economist for describing him as "alt-right" in their interview with him; in response, The Economist issued an apology and modified the article title to instead describe Shapiro as a "radical conservative".

Shapiro has been a target of online harassment and anti-semitic threats from the alt-right. After leaving Breitbart News, Shapiro was a frequent target of antisemitic rhetoric from the alt-right. According to a 2016 analysis by the Anti-Defamation League, Shapiro was the most frequent target of antisemitic tweets against journalists.

Climate change 
Shapiro has acknowledged that climate change is occurring, but questioned "what percentage of global warming is attributable to human activity." Regarding sea-level rise as a result of climate change which will result in coastal property being flooded, Shapiro said, "You think people aren't just going to sell their homes and move?". He was accused of climate change denial by Scientific American for an opinion piece on the 2020 California wildfires, with the outlet arguing climate change contributed more to the severity of the fires than state policies, as Shapiro had claimed. In 2021, he said he believed that 4 °C (7.2 °F) of global warming should not be considered an emergency and that he viewed this as "purely a political designation".

Facebook 
In 2018, Shapiro argued that Facebook was targeting conservative sites after the platform implemented an algorithm change, limiting their traffic, and that they are not transparent enough. In 2021, an article in NPR revealed that the Daily Wire dominated Facebook news feeds and received more engagement than any other news outlet under Shapiro's leadership.

Gun ownership 
Following the December 2012 Sandy Hook Elementary School shooting, Shapiro appeared on CNN's Piers Morgan Tonight on January 10, 2013. On the issue of gun control, Shapiro called Piers Morgan a "bully" who "tends to demonize people who differ from you politically by standing on the graves of the children of Sandy Hook, saying they don't seem to care enough about the dead kids." Videos of the encounter quickly received millions of views and went viral.

Writing in October 2017, in the aftermath of the Las Vegas shooting, Shapiro argued that "banning all guns would be unwise as well as immoral," but "we must balance the need and right to firearms with public policy concerns, including the risk that a machine gun will be used in public." Shapiro suggested that policy makers "should look at ways of enforcing federal laws banning the sale of guns to the mentally ill."

Health 
In 2021, Shapiro said that he was in favor of the COVID-19 vaccine and that he was vaccinated, but is against COVID-19 vaccine mandates.

Foreign policy 
According to Shapiro, the reason behind the Israeli–Palestinian conflict was that "Israel exists, and Hamas wishes it didn't exist". In 2003, Shapiro published a column on Townhall demanding that Israel "transfer the Palestinians and the Israeli-Arabs from Judea, Samaria, Gaza and Israel proper." Citing expulsion of Germans after World War II as a precedent, Shapiro insisted that "expelling a hostile population is a commonly-used and generally effective way of preventing violent entanglements." In the same article, Shapiro said that "The ideology of the Palestinian population is indistinguishable from that of the terrorist leadership." Jeffrey Goldberg was highly critical of these comments and cited them as an example of Shapiro's "fascist" behavior. Shapiro later reversed his view on the West Bank issue, saying it was "both inhumane and impractical".

In 2010, Shapiro said "Israelis like to build. Arabs like to bomb crap and live in open sewage". He later clarified that he was talking about the Israeli and Arab leadership, as well as terrorist groups in Palestine.

Shapiro supported Israel's settlement building in the occupied Palestinian territories in the West Bank. Shapiro is a longtime opponent of the two-state solution.

In 2007, Shapiro wrote an article in which he described the "Palestinian Arab population" as "rotten to the core" and places the blame for the Arab–Israeli conflict "with the Palestinian Arabs themselves". He further believes Israel and America will "continue to pay the price in blood and treasure" if they refuse to recognize the "simple truth" that the "Palestinian Arab population breeds terrorism, antisemitism and anti-Americanism".

In 2019, Shapiro said that Democratic congresswoman Ilhan Omar, whose comments about American support for Israel were accused of evoking antisemitic tropes, and the white supremacist San Diego shooter, hold "a lot of the same opinions about Jews."

In May 2021, during the 2021 Israel–Palestine crisis, Ben Shapiro stated that Hamas' rocket attacks "would entail an anti-Semitic genocide", adding that Hamas was spending "tens of millions of dollars in foreign aid" on building "terror tunnels and rocket capacity to strike at the Jews." Shapiro argued that Hamas was positioning its rockets in civilian areas, seeking to "force Israel to kill Palestinian civilians so Hamas can propagandize about supposed Israeli human rights atrocities." He stated that Hamas was killing not only Jews, but also Israeli Arabs and foreign workers. He also criticized the media coverage of the crisis, labeling it as "absurd", and The New York Times for their opinion article featuring a Palestinian writer titled "The Myth of Coexistence in Israel", saying that the main image used for the article, a map of Israel, was "so bad that MSNBC, which used the image in 2015, had to retract it and admit it was factually incorrect."

In a 2002 article, Shapiro wrote, "I am getting really sick of people who whine about 'civilian casualties'... when I see in the newspapers that civilians in Afghanistan or the West Bank were killed by American or Israeli troops, I don't really care". Shapiro declared that "One American soldier is worth far more than an Afghan civilian", accusing Afghan civilians of being "fundamentalist Muslims" who provide cover for terrorists or give them money. Shapiro later apologized for these assertions. He stated that the 2002 article was "just a bad piece, plain and simple, and something I wish I'd never written". He said that while he still partially agreed with his article's main point—"that we must calculate the risk to American services members when we design rules of engagement"—he "expressed [that point] in the worst possible way, and simplified the issue beyond the bounds of morality (particularly by doubting the civilian status of some civilians)".

Shapiro supported the 2003 invasion of Iraq, arguing that "China is a dictatorship. North Korea is a dictatorship. Saudi Arabia, Libya, Syria, Pakistan and Egypt are all dictatorships. We can't overthrow all of those regimes simply to free their citizens. We have to focus on those regimes that endanger American security."

LGBT issues 
In 2010, Shapiro drew controversy for arguing that homosexuality should be listed as a mental illness in the DSM.

Shapiro opposed the Obergefell v. Hodges Supreme Court ruling that deemed bans of same-sex marriage unconstitutional. However, he opposes government involvement in marriage, saying, "I think the government stinks at this," and expressing concern that because of the ruling in Obergefell v. Hodges, at some point the government may try to force religious institutions to perform same-sex weddings against their will. According to Slates Seth Stevenson, Shapiro has described homosexuality as a sin. He has said that "a man and a woman do a better job of raising a child than two men or two women".

He has stated he does not feel same-sex marriage should be taught to students in schools, saying, "In California, they've already passed laws that you have to teach same-sex marriage in public schools, for example... I went to public school for elementary school and junior high, I don't know why the government is teaching me anything about this stuff. This is for my parents to teach me. This is a values thing." He also states, "I'm very much anti gay-marriage in the social sense. As a religious person, I think homosexuality is a sin, I think that lots of things are sins that people engage in, I think they should be free to engage in them." In 2014, Heidi Beirich of the Southern Poverty Law Center disputed Shapiro's assertion that the United States "is not a country that discriminates against homosexuals" and that "there is a vastly minute amount of discrimination against gays in this country."

Shapiro believes transgender people suffer from mental illness. He has commented, "You can't magically change your gender. You can't magically change your sex," and has compared such changes to the notion of changing one's age. Shapiro also opposes same-sex couples raising children.

In July 2015, Shapiro and transgender rights activist Zoey Tur were on Dr. Drew On Call to discuss Caitlyn Jenner's receipt of the Arthur Ashe Courage Award. After Shapiro referred to Tur, who is a trans woman, as "sir" and questioned her genetics, she placed her hand on the back of his neck and threatened on air to send him "home in an ambulance". Shapiro replied, "That seems mildly inappropriate for a political discussion." Later, Shapiro filed a police report charging Tur with battery and stated that he intended to press charges to teach the left a lesson. Tur said the report was Shapiro's attempt to keep the story in the news.

In 2019, in response to 2020 Democratic Party presidential candidate Beto O'Rourke calling for the removal of the tax-exempt status of religious institutions opposed to same-sex marriage, Shapiro said that if O'Rourke was going to try to "indoctrinate" his children in religious schools, Shapiro would be forced to either "leave the country" or "pick up a gun."

Donald Trump 
In the spring of 2016, Shapiro wrote an article for the Daily Wire in which he exclaimed that he "will never vote for Donald Trump". Shapiro supported Ted Cruz in the 2016 presidential election and opposed Donald Trump's candidacy. In August 2016, Shapiro wrote an article for the Daily Wire suggesting that Trump, if elected, would not appoint conservative justices to the Supreme Court. He called Steve Bannon a "bully" who "sold out Breitbart founder Andrew Breitbart's mission in order to back another bully, Donald Trump." Shapiro has suggested that the election of Trump was more a vote against Hillary Clinton than a vote in favor of Trump.

During Trump's presidency, Shapiro supported his administration's ordering the killing of Qasem Soleimani, recognizing Jerusalem as the capital of Israel, and the nominations of Brett Kavanaugh and Neil Gorsuch to the Supreme Court. Shapiro also supported Trump withdrawing from the Paris Agreement, cutting regulations, and his nomination of 12 appellate court judges. However, Shapiro opposed and criticized Trump for firing James Comey, his appointments of Michael Flynn and Steve Bannon, and endorsing Roy Moore.

On October 19, 2020, Shapiro announced that he would be voting for Trump in the 2020 presidential election: "There are three reasons I'm going to vote for Donald Trump in 2020 when I didn't four years ago: First, I was simply wrong about Donald Trump on policy. Second, I wasn't really wrong about Donald Trump on character, but whatever damage he was going to do has already been done, and it's not going to help if I don't vote for him this time. And third, and most importantly: The Democrats have lost their fucking minds." He rebuked Trump on election night, November 3, 2020, when Trump prematurely claimed himself the winner when neither he nor his opponent Joe Biden had yet reached the 270 electoral votes required to win the presidency. He tweeted: "No, Trump has not already won the election, and it is deeply irresponsible for him to say he has." Shapiro denounced the false claim that Trump was the legitimate winner of the 2020 election. He criticized the January 6 Capitol attack whilst also criticizing the Democratic Party.

Race 
He has acknowledged that African-Americans were historically victims of injustice in the United States, but does not believe in the existence of widespread systemic injustice today. In 2017, Shapiro stated that "the idea that black people in the United States are disproportionately poor because America is racist; that's just not true." Shapiro has dismissed the idea that the United States was founded on slavery and argued that America was founded in spite of slavery.

Shapiro is critical of Black Lives Matter and has argued that "the Black Lives Matter movement did indeed begin with protests about police brutality but quickly morphed into broader debates over the validity of looting and rioting, tearing down historic statues, slavery reparations and defunding the police."

Shapiro was one of several conservative commentators condemning Representative Steve King (R-IA) after King's January 2019 comments in defense of the terms "white supremacy" and "white nationalism". Shapiro called for King to be censured, and supported King's 2020 primary challenger Randy Feenstra.

Religion
Shapiro practices Orthodox Judaism, which informs his ideological positions. Traditionalist in nature, following the religion means that Shapiro wears a cap called a yarmulke. In a 2011 tweet, Shapiro claimed that Judaism is plagued by "Bad Jews" who "largely vote Democrat". The same year, he wrote an article titled "Jews in Name Only" in which he claimed "Jews who vote for Obama are, by and large, Jews In Name Only (JINOs)" and that such Jews "do not care about Israel" or that they "care about it less than abortion, gay marriage and global warming". During the 2016 presidential election, he wrote an article titled "No, It Doesn't Matter That Bernie Sanders Is Ethnically Jewish. He's a Jew In Name Only."

In a 2014, YouTube video entitled "The Myth of the Tiny Radical Muslim Minority", Shapiro said, "We're above 800 million Muslims who are radicalized – more than half the Muslims on earth. That's not a minority... the myth of the tiny radical Muslim minority is just that: it's a myth". Fact-checks by PolitiFact and Channel 4 News in the UK rejected his methodology largely on the basis that support for Sharia law being made the official law of a nation state was not sufficient to label an individual a "radical Muslim", while adding that "The meaning of Sharia law varies from sect to sect and nation to nation." Channel 4 News also critiqued his usage of polls with sample sizes of a few thousand as an accurate representation of the views of tens of millions of Muslims. PolitiFact concluded that his claim was false. While Channel 4 News acknowledged "that some polls do show that very illiberal values and concepts can be prevalent in some Muslim countries", there is also "a huge diversity of views among different Muslim countries and that people's beliefs can change dramatically in a few years."

In 2018, a Royal Canadian Mounted Police (RCMP) document presented at the sentencing hearing of Quebec mosque shooter Alexandre Bissonnette showed that the murderer checked in on Shapiro's Twitter feed 93 times in the month leading up to the shooting. Shapiro condemned the attack and called Bissonnette an "evil piece of human crap".

In October 2022, Shapiro condemned Kanye West's antisemitic comments, comparing them to propaganda in Nazi Germany. He also called West "unstable."

He has also said immigrants from Islamic countries "degrade" the United States.

United States politics 
In 2006, Shapiro called for sedition laws to be reinstated. He cited speeches critical of the George W. Bush administration by Democrats Al Gore, John Kerry and Howard Dean as "disloyal" and seditious. Shapiro subsequently retracted these views in a 2018 column, stating that his 2006 column "absolutely blows. It's garbage" and adding that the idea of sedition laws was "inherently idiotic". Shapiro later described President Barack Obama's 2010 State of the Union Address as "philosophically fascist."

Shapiro has called for lowering taxes on the very wealthy. He has also backed privatizing Social Security and repealing the Affordable Care Act. In August 2022, Shapiro argued that "Marxism can't work in America," saying this was because of "high levels of societal income mobility".

Personal life 

In 2008, Shapiro married Mor Toledano, an Israeli medical doctor of Moroccan descent, and they lived in Los Angeles. The couple has two daughters and a son. They practice Orthodox Judaism. 
In 2019, the FBI arrested a man from Washington for making death threats against Shapiro and his family.

In September 2020, Shapiro announced that he and his family were moving out of California. Shapiro relocated the headquarters of his Daily Wire enterprise to Nashville, Tennessee, but he resettled in South Florida.

Shapiro's sister, Abigail Shapiro, who studied operatic singing, is a conservative female media influencer who posts videos on her YouTube channel "Classically Abby". She has been subjected to online antisemitic trolling due to her brother's high public profile. Ben Shapiro is a cousin of writer and actress Mara Wilson, though the two are not on speaking terms due to their conflicting political views.

Bibliography 
 Brainwashed: How Universities Indoctrinate America's Youth. WND Books (2004). .
 Porn Generation: How Social Liberalism Is Corrupting Our Future. Regnery (2005). .
 Project President: Bad Hair and Botox on the Road to the White House. Thomas Nelson (2008). .
 Primetime Propaganda: The True Hollywood Story of How the Left Took Over Your TV. HarperCollins (2011). .
 Bullies: How the Left's Culture of Fear and Intimidation Silences America. Threshold Editions (2013). .
 The People vs. Barack Obama: The Criminal Case Against the Obama Administration. Threshold Editions (2014). .
 A Moral Universe Torn Apart. Creator's Publishing (2014). .
 What's Fair and Other Short Stories. Amazon e-book only (no longer available). Revolutionary Publishing (2015).
 True Allegiance. Post Hill Press (2017). .
 Say It's So: Papa, Dad, Me and 2005 White Sox Championship Season. CreateSpace Independent Publishing Platform (May 2017). .
 The Right Side of History: How Reason and Moral Purpose Made the West Great. Broadside Books (2019). .
 Facts Don't Care about Your Feelings. Creators Publishing (Nov. 2019). .
 How to Destroy America in Three Easy Steps. HarperCollins (2020). . preview
 Catastrophic Thinking. Creators Publishing (Feb. 2020). .
 Facts (Still) Don't Care About Your Feelings. Creators Publishing (Sep. 2020). .
 The Authoritarian Moment: How the Left Weaponized America's Institutions Against Dissent. Broadside Books (Jul. 2021). .

See also 
 Intellectual dark web, a loose collection of public personalities of which Shapiro is often cited as an example
 Owning the libs
 List of Phi Beta Kappa members by year of admission
 List of Harvard Law School alumni
 List of syndicated columnists
 List of American conservatives

References

External links 

 The Daily Wire
 California Bar profile

 
 In Depth interview with Shapiro, September 1, 2013

1984 births
Living people
20th-century American Jews
21st-century American businesspeople
21st-century American Jews
21st-century American non-fiction writers
Activists from Los Angeles
American anti-abortion activists
American chief executives in the media industry
American columnists
American conservative talk radio hosts
American political activists
American Orthodox Jews
American infotainers
American legal writers
American libertarians
American male bloggers
American male non-fiction writers
American mass media company founders
American mass media owners
American media critics
American people of Lithuanian-Jewish descent
American people of Russian-Jewish descent
American political commentators
American political writers
American social activists
American social commentators
American YouTubers
American Zionists
Breitbart News people
Businesspeople from Los Angeles
Commentary YouTubers
Critics of Black Lives Matter
Harvard Law School alumni
Jewish American attorneys
Jewish American writers
Jewish American activists
Lawyers from Los Angeles
News YouTubers
Radio personalities from Los Angeles
The Daily Wire people
University of California, Los Angeles alumni
Writers from Los Angeles
Writers on Zionism